The 2011–12 Serie D was the sixty-fourth edition of the top level Italian non-professional football championship. It represented the fifth tier in the Italian football league system. It consisted of 168 teams divided into six 18-team divisions and three 20-team divisions.

In the summer 2011 Montecchio Maggiore was readmitted in Serie D to the judgment of the High Court of Justice, that has transformed the score of Montebelluna-Este from 2–1 to 0–3, for infringement of the rule on under. And the last team admitted was Verbano, increasing the total number of teams to 168.

On December 15, 2011 Aquanera was excluded by the National Disciplinary Committee for irregularities at registration, reducing the total number of teams to 167. All matches played by the team have been annulled.

Each team played two matches against every other team in its own division; a total of 34 matches for the five groups of 18 teams, 36 matches for the group A of 19 teams and 38 matches for the groups B-D of 20 teams.

Promotions
The nine division winners are automatically promoted to Lega Pro Seconda Divisione 2012–13.

On 25 April 2012 Sterilgarda Castiglione and Pontedera became the first teams to be promoted from Serie D in the season, winning respectively the Girone B and E with two weeks remaining in the schedule.

On 29 April 2012 were promoted Venezia, Forlì, Teramo and HinterReggio winning respectively the Girone C, D, F and I with one week remaining in the schedule.

On 6 May 2012 were promoted V.d.A. Saint-Christophe, Salerno and Martina Franca winning respectively the Girone A, G and H.

Playoffs
Teams placed second through fifth in each division enter a playoff tournament, after the regular season, where the nine winners will compete among themselves with the best semifinalist and the finalist of Coppa Italia Serie D to determine three of the four semi-finalists. The fourth is the winner of Coppa Italia Serie D.

The final match of playoffs, between the winners of the semifinals, was won by Cosenza, but it is not automatically promoted. It finishes first and the other finalist SandonàJesolo comes in second in this 39-team playoff. Eventually these teams may be included up to Lega Pro Seconda Divisione if one or more current teams runs into financial difficulties and so are not admitted in this league.

Relegations Playout
 In the groups C-E-F-G-H-I of 18 teams the two last-placed teams (17th and 18th) with the 16th, if the 13th place is more of 8 points ahead of it and the 15th, if the 14th place is more of 8 points ahead of this, are relegated directly. Otherwise the teams ranked 13th to 16th play a two-legged playout (13th vs 16th, and 14th vs 15th).
 In the group A of 19 teams the last-placed team (19th) with the 18th, if the 15th place is more of 8 points ahead of it and the 17th, if the 16th place is more of 8 points ahead of this, are relegated directly. Otherwise the teams ranked 15th to 18th play a two-legged playout (15th vs 18th, and 16th vs 17th).
 In the groups B-D of 20 teams the two last-placed teams (19th and 20th) with the 18th, if the 15th place is more of 8 points ahead of it and the 17th, if the 16th place is more of 8 points ahead of this, are relegated directly. Otherwise the teams ranked 15th to 18th play a two-legged playout (15th vs 18th, and 16th vs 17th).

Tie-Breakers
If the two teams finish in an aggregate tie for to decide who is promoted and relegated, one tie breaker will be played in neutral ground, with possible extra time and penalties.

Scudetto Dilettanti
The nine division winners enter a tournament to determine the over-all Serie D champion and is awarded the Scudetto Dilettanti. The winner is Venezia.

Events

Start of season
Given a normal season where there are no team failures and special promotions, Serie D would feature 9 teams that had been relegated from Lega Pro Seconda Divisione, 36 teams that had been promoted from Eccellenza, and 122 teams that had played in Serie D the year before.

Due to ten bankruptcies and one extra promotion in Serie D, the 2011–12 season was to feature 3 teams that played in the 2010-11 Lega Pro Seconda Divisione season, including the admitted Brindisi (Girone H) that went bankrupt in that league, 42 teams that played in the 2010-11 Eccellenza season and 119 teams that played in 2010–11 Serie D, including the readmitted Montecchio Maggiore and the excluded Aquanera respectively after the judgment of the High Court of Justice and the National Disciplinary Committee.

The league also admitted three of the teams that were excluded from the professional leagues. Ravenna (Girone D), Salerno, formerly Salernitana (Girone G) and Cosenza (Girone I) which all played in the 2010-11 Lega Pro Prima Divisione season. The league further admitted eleven teams from Eccellenza to fill the vacancies created. These teams are:

 Villafranca which finished 14th in Serie D 2010–11 Girone B
 Carpenedolo which finished 15th in Serie D 2010–11 Girone D
 Sestese which finished 13th in Serie D 2010–11 Girone E
 Miglianico which finished 18th in Serie D 2010–11 Girone F
 Sant'Antonio Abate which finished 13th in Serie D 2010–11 Girone H
 Lascaris which finished 2nd in Eccellenza Piedmont Girone B and was eliminated in the national play-off
 Verbano which finished 3rd in Eccellenza Lombardy Girone A and was eliminated in the national play-off
 Fidenza which finished 2nd in Eccellenza Emilia–Romagna Girone A and was eliminated in the national play-off
 Cerea which finished 2nd in Eccellenza Veneto Girone A and was eliminated in the national play-off
 Adrano which finished 3rd in Eccellenza Sicily Girone B and was eliminated in the national play-off
 Civitavecchia which finished 2nd in Eccellenza Lazio Girone A and was eliminated in the national play-off.

Standings

Girone A

Teams 
Teams from Aosta Valley, Piedmont, Liguria, & Lombardy

League table

Girone B

Teams 
Teams from Lombardy, Piedmont & Emilia-Romagna

League table

Girone C

Teams
Teams from Veneto, Trentino-Alto Adige/Südtirol & Friuli-Venezia Giulia

League table

Girone D

Teams
Teams from Emilia-Romagna, Tuscany & Veneto

League table

Girone E

Teams 
Teams from Tuscany, Umbria & Lazio

League table

Girone F

Teams
Teams from Emilia-Romagna, Marche, Abruzzo & Molise

League table

Girone G

Teams
Teams from Campania, Lazio & Sardinia

League table

Girone H

Teams
Teams from Campania, Apulia, Lazio & Basilicata

League table

Girone I

Teams
Teams from Campania, Calabria, & Sicily

League table

Divisions

Champions of winter and Promotions

All teams promoted to Lega Pro Seconda Divisione 2012–13.

Scudetto Dilettanti

First round
division winners placed into 3 groups of 3
group winners and best second-placed team qualify for semi-finals

Group 1

Group 2

Group 3

Semi-finals
One leg played on May 24, 2012

Games ending in a tie are extended to the penalty kicks without play extra time

On neutral ground at Città di Castello, Stadio Comunale "Bernicchi"

On neutral ground at Umbertide, Stadio Comunale "Morandi"

Final
Played on May 26, 2012
Game ending in a tie are extended to the penalty kicks without play extra time
On neutral ground at Gubbio, Stadio Pietro Barbetti

Winner: Venezia

Tie-break

 Before the relegation playoff could begin, one tie-break needed to be played.

Girone H - 16th-17th place - Played on May 13, 2012

Real Nocera qualified for the relegation playoff and Viribus Unitis relegated to Eccellenza.

Promotion playoffs

Promotion playoffs involved a total of 39 teams; four from each of the nine Serie D divisions (teams placed from 2nd through to 5th) with the best semifinalist, the finalist and the winner of Coppa Italia Serie D that are directly respectively admitted to the third, fourth round and the Semi-final.

Rules

First and second round 
 The first two rounds were one-legged matches played in the home field of the best-placed team.
 The games ending in ties were extended to extra time. The higher classified team was declared the winner if the game was still tied after extra time. Penalty kicks were not taken.
 Round one matched 2nd & 5th-placed teams and 3rd & 4th-placed teams within each division.
 The two winners from each division played each other in the second round.

Third and fourth round 
 The nine winners – one each from the nine Serie D divisions – were qualified with Bogliasco, as the best semifinalist of Coppa Italia Serie D to the third round, that was played in one-legged match in the home field of the best-placed team. 
 The five winners were qualified with SandonàJesolo, as finalist of Coppa Italia Serie D to the fourth round, that was played in one-legged match in the home field of the best-placed team.
 The games ending in ties were extended to the penalty kicks, without play extra time.

Semi-finals and final 
 The three 4th-round winners were qualified for the semifinal round, join with Sant'Antonio Abate, as Coppa Italia Serie D winner.
 The semi-finals and the final, with the respective winners, were in a one-legged hosted in a neutral ground.
 The games ending in ties were extended to the penalty kicks, without play extra time.

Repechages 
 The tournament results provided a list, starting with the winner, by which vacancies could be filled in Lega Pro Seconda Divisione.
 If the winner is not admitted in this league gets 30 000 €, the finalist instead 15 000 €.

First round
Played on May 13, 2012
Single-legged matches played at best placed club home field: 2nd-placed team plays home 5th-placed team, 3rd-placed team plays home 4th placed team
Games ending in a tie are extended to extra time, if still tied, the higher-classified team wins

Second round
Played on May 16, 2012 
Single-legged matches played at best placed club home field
Games ending in a tie are extended to extra time, if still tied, the higher-classified team wins

Third round
Played on May 20, 2012 
Single-legged matches played at best placed club home field
Games ending in a tie are extended to the penalty kicks without play extra time
Bogliasco qualified directly as best semifinalist of Coppa Italia Serie D

Fourth round
Played on May 27, 2012 
Single-legged matches played at best placed club home field
Games ending in a tie are extended to the penalty kicks without play extra time
SandonàJesolo qualified directly as finalist of Coppa Italia Serie D

Semi-finals
One leg played on June 3, 2012
Games ending in a tie are extended to the penalty kicks without play extra time
Sant'Antonio Abate qualified directly as winner of Coppa Italia Serie D

On neutral ground at Belluno, Stadio "Polisportivo Comunale"

On neutral ground at Matera, Stadio "XXI Settembre - Franco Salerno"

Final
Played on June 10, 2012
On neutral ground
If the game ending in a tie is extended to the penalty kicks without play extra time

On neutral ground at Arezzo, Stadio Città di Arezzo

Winner: Cosenza

Relegation playoffs
Played on May 20 & May 27, 2012
In case of aggregate tie score, higher classified team that plays the 2nd match in home wins, without extra time being played
Team highlighted in green is saved, other is relegated to Eccellenza

Footnotes

Serie D seasons
5
Ita